Chiloglanis voltae  is a species of upside-down catfish native to Burkina Faso, Cameroon, Ghana, Nigeria and Togo, where it occurs in the Volta and Bénoué River systems.  This species grows to a length of  TL.

References

External links 

voltae
Catfish of Africa
Freshwater fish of West Africa
Fish of Cameroon
Fish described in 1963